Nhlanhla is a given name. Notable people with the name include:

Nhlanhla Dlamini (born 1986), South African basketball player with Vaal University of South Africa's Premier Basketball League
Nhlanhla Khuzwayo (born 1990), South African international footballer
Nhlanhla Nene (born 1958), the Minister of Finance of South Africa, appointed on 25 May 2014
Joe Nhlanhla (1936–2008), African National Congress national executive and the former South African Intelligence Minister
Nhlanhla Shabalala (born 1985), South African football (soccer) midfielder for Premier Soccer League club AmaZulu
Nhlanhla Vilakazi (born 1987), South African professional footballer

See also
Nahla (disambiguation)